Henry Harper may refer to:

 Henry Albert Harper (1873–1901), Canadian journalist & politician
 Henry Harper (canoeist) (1929–1957), Canadian Olympic canoeist
 Henry Harper (bishop) (1804–1893), Anglican bishop in New Zealand
 Henry S. Harper (1864–1944), American Publisher & RMS Titanic survivor
 Henry Harper (priest) (1833–1922), New Zealand Anglican priest

See also
 Harry Harper (disambiguation)
 Henry Harpur (disambiguation)
 Harper (disambiguation)